Əfəndilər or Efendilyar may refer to:
Əfəndilər, Jabrayil, Azerbaijan
Əfəndilər, Qubadli, Azerbaijan